Alligator thomsoni is an extinct species of alligator that existed during the Early Miocene period. Their range was principally in what is now known as Nebraska, United States.

Measurements
The average measurement for the skull of a A. thomsoni is 363.0 x 223.0 in millimeters. Based on the length, the estimated body mass 67.8 kg.

References

Alligatoridae
Miocene reptiles of North America
Fossil taxa described in 1923